Alice Amsden, building on the insights of Gerschenkron, identifies Late Industrialization as a particular form of industrialization the study of which is useful for those interested in study of the prospects for material progress in developing countries. Amsden notes that whilst the 1st industrial revolution in the UK towards the end of the eighteenth century, and the 2nd industrial revolution 100 years later in Germany and the US both involved new products and processes, the countries that did not start industrialization until the 20th century tended to generate neither new products nor processes. These, the late industrializers, raised their income and transformed their productive structures using borrowed technology.

Another take on this would be that the 1st industrial revolution was based on invention, the 2nd on the basis of innovation and more recently in the late industrializers are industrializing on the basis of learning.

Amsden's uses her thesis of late industrialization to discuss the following countries: South Korea, Taiwan, Brazil, India, possibly Mexico, and Turkey and also Japan although this last country is regarded as, in many respects, special.

Learning in these countries has been achieved through the use of similar institutions in particular those associated with industrial policy. These learners compete, initially at least, via low wages, state subsidies or other forms of government supports, and gradual increases in quality of, and efficiency in producing, existing products. The shop floor in businesses tends to be the “strategic focus” when competition is based on borrowed technology.

The late industrializers have moved into the more mature markets of the innovators and the productivity of long-established innovators has been successfully challenged by the learners' lower wages, intense efforts to raise productivity and firms supported by industrial policy.

References

Development economics
Industrialisation
Industrial policy